54 Ceti is an older Flamsteed designation for a star that is now located within the constellation boundaries of Aries, the Ram. In the present day it is known by star catalogue identifiers like HD 11257 or HR 534. At an apparent visual magnitude of 5.94, it can be seen with the naked eye. It is located near the ecliptic and hence is subject to occasional occultation by the Moon.

This is an F-type main sequence star with a stellar classification of F2 Vw, where the 'w' indicates weak absorption lines in the spectrum. The star is around 582 million years old with a projected rotational velocity of 29 km/s. It has 1.5 times the mass of the Sun and 1.6 times the Sun's radius. The star is radiating six times the luminosity of the Sun from its photosphere at an effective temperature of 7,099 K. It is a candidate member of the Ursa Major Moving Group, which has an estimated age of  years.

References

External links
 HR 534
 Image 54 Ceti

F-type main-sequence stars
Ursa Major Moving Group

Aries (constellation)
Durchmusterung objects
Ceti, 54
011257
008588
0534